Orbetello is a town and comune in the province of Grosseto (Tuscany), Italy.

History

Orbetello  was an ancient Etruscan settlement, which in 280 BC passed under the control of the Romans, who had founded their colony of Cosa (near the modern Ansedonia).

The emperor Domitian had a substantial property here, which had belonged to the Domitii Ahenobarbi and he inherited through his wife Domitia Longina. He also built other sumptuous villas nearby for his courtiers.

In the Middle Ages it was a possession of the Aldobrandeschi family, who held it until the 14th century, when it was acquired by the city of Orvieto. After several struggles with the Orsini of Pitigliano and Orvieto, in the following centuries Orbetello was captured by the Sienese Republic. In the mid-16th century it was part of the State of Presides, a Spanish possession, becoming its capital.

The town was besieged by the French during the 1635-1659 Franco-Spanish War. This led to the inconclusive naval Battle of Orbetello on 14 June; in July, a Spanish army forced the French to lift the siege.

It formed part of the Grand Duchy of Tuscany until 1860, when it joined the newly unified Kingdom of Italy.

In 1927–33, Italo Balbo's "air cruises" started from Orbetello's lagoon.  During World War II, the German Air Force's 2nd Squadron of Embarked Air Group 196 used the lagoon as a base for its Arado Ar 196 float planes for a brief period in 1943.

Government

Frazioni 
The municipality is formed by the municipal seat of Orbetello and the towns and villages (frazioni) of Albinia, Ansedonia, Fonteblanda, Giannella, San Donato and Talamone.

List of mayors

Main sights
The city walls (5th century BC).
Cathedral of Santa Maria Assunta, built over an Etruscan-Roman temple and restructured in 1375 along Tuscan-Gothic lines. Preceded by a step, it houses some notable 15th-century frescoes.
The Spanish Forte delle Saline, in the frazione of Albinia.
Remains of the Roman city of Cosa in the frazione of Ansedonia.
Ruins of the Monastery of Sant'Angelo.

References

External links
 

 
Peninsulas of Italy